The State of Kedah Star of Gallantry (Bahasa Melayu: Bintang Perkasa Negeri Kedah) is an honorific military decoration of the Sultanate of Kedah

History 
It was founded by Sultan Badlishah of Kedah on 30 October 1952.

Recipients 
It is as a reward for conspicuous acts of gallantry by the military, police or civilians, but of a standard less than the Star of Valour (B.K.K). This Medal may be awarded posthumously.

Classes 
It is awarded in one class: 
 Silver Star - Post-nominal letters : BPK

Insignia 
It is composed of a six-pointed silver star hung from a dark blue ribbon with 2 white stripes. Photos :  1

References 

Military awards and decorations of Malaysia
Orders, decorations, and medals of Kedah